Robert Dawe may refer to:

 Norman Dawe (Robert Norman Dawe, 1898–1948), Canadian sports executive 
 Robert Shayne (Robert Shaen Dawe, 1900–1992), American actor